Jennifer Brown may refer to:

Jennifer Brown (author) (born 1972), American writer
Jennifer Brown (singer) (born 1972), Swedish singer
Jennifer Brown (statistician), New Zealand statistician
Jennifer Brown (athlete) (born 1980), Canadian Paralympic athlete
Jennifer Michelle Brown (born 1995), American actress and musician 
Jenn Brown (born 1981), American TV personality
Jennifer S. H. Brown (born 1940), American-Canadian historian

See also
Jenny Brown (disambiguation)